Manojit Mohan Dhar (1927–2003) was an Indian natural product chemist and the director of Central Drug Research Institute. He was known for his researches on peptides and the synthesis of the internucleotide bond and was an elected fellow of the Indian National Science Academy. The Council of Scientific and Industrial Research, the apex agency of the Government of India for scientific research, awarded him the Shanti Swarup Bhatnagar Prize for Science and Technology, one of the highest Indian science awards, in 1971, for his contributions to chemical sciences.

Biography 
M. M. Dhar, born on 13 January 1927, secured a PhD from Manchester University in 1952 for his thesis on peptides and joined Central Drug Research Institute (CDRI) where he worked as a deputy director, heading the Division of Medicinal Chemistry and Botany and subsequently, as the director of the institute. Later, he worked as the counselor of science to the High Commission of India to the United Kingdom. His researches were focused on the constituents of a number of indigenous plants and he studied their structures with a view to find their therapeutic uses. Thus, he discovered the glycosidase activity of decapeptides, abortifacient properties of tetrapeptide, receptor mimicking of acetylcholines and immunostimulant and immunosuppressant qualities of compounds that target opioid receptors. He was known to have screened over three thousand indigenous plant species for studying their structures and through his researches, he suggested that the secondary metabolites of microbial origin were formed during the detoxification of toxic constituent of the microorganism. He identified several active ingredients in plants and developed a new method of synthesis of internucleotide bond, using pyrimidine and purine anhydronucleosides. He discovered that the synthesis of quinomycin A could be catalysed by a cell-free extract of streptomyces. He was also a part of the CDRI investigation on parasitic protozoa causing diseases such as amoebiasis, leishmaniasis, filariasis, malaria and helminthiasis.

Dhar published his research findings in a number of articles and his works have been quoted by many scholars. He was associated with Bombay Natural History Society and Indian Chemical Society as a life member and sat in the council of Indian National Science Academy from 1988 to 1990. A former chair (1982) of the Commonwealth Agricultural Bureau International, he served as the commissioner of India chapter of the International Whaling Commission in 1982 and was a member of the Indian delegation to United Nations Vienna Conference on S&T for Development in 1979, Man and the Biosphere Programme conference held in Paris in 1979, World Climate Conference of Geneva in 1979 and the Heads of Science meeting of Group of 77 in Delhi in 1982.

M. M. Dhar died on 26 May 2003 at the age of 76.

Awards and honours 
The Council of Scientific and Industrial Research awarded Dhar the Shanti Swarup Bhatnagar Prize, one of the highest Indian science awards, in 1971 and the A. V. Mody Research Foundation Award reached him 1975. In between, the Indian National Science Academy elected him as their fellow in 1973. The Central Drug Research Institute have instituted an annual award, Dr. M. M. Dhar Memorial Distinguished Career Achievement Award, for honouring excellence in research in chemical sciences.

Citations

Selected bibliography

See also 
 Decapeptide
 Tetrapeptide
 Acetylcholine

Notes

References 

Recipients of the Shanti Swarup Bhatnagar Award in Chemical Science
1927 births
2003 deaths
20th-century Indian chemists
Alumni of the University of Manchester
Indian scientific authors
Fellows of the Indian National Science Academy
Members of the Bombay Natural History Society